The 1994 Protocol of Ouro Preto was the continuation of economic policies setting up a customs union, as set forth four years earlier in the Treaty of Asunción by the four original Mercosur states. (Consisting of Argentina, Brazil, Paraguay and Uruguay)

Mercosur
Customs treaties
Treaties concluded in 1994
Treaties of Argentina
Treaties of Brazil
Treaties of Paraguay
Treaties of Uruguay
Argentina–Brazil relations
1994 in Brazil